This article lists the provinces of South Africa by their gross regional domestic product (GDP) per capita.

See also
 List of South African provinces by gross domestic product
 List of South African provinces by population
 Economy of South Africa

References

South Africa
Gross domestic product per capita
South African provinces by gross domestic product per capita
Gross domestic product per capita
Provinces by gross domestic product per capita